The 6th Annual Latin American Music Awards were held at the BB&T Center in Sunrise, Florida. It was broadcast live on Telemundo. J Balvin and Karol G led the nominations, with nine nods each.

Performers

Presenters 
Premiere ceremony
Ana Bárbara
Carlos Adyan
Jorge Bernal
Rodner Figueroa
Vadhir Derbez
Zuleyka Rivera
Andrea Balsa
Main ceremony

Ariadna Gutiérrez
Alex Fernández
Arthur Hanlon
Adamari López
Christian Chávez
Chayanne
Danilo Carrera
Danny Feliz
Fonseca
Gaby Espino
Goyo

Jaqueline Bracamontes
Jesús Moré
Jessi Uribe
Marc Anthony
Maribel Guardia
Ninel Conde
Prince Royce
Seven Kayne
William Levy
Zozibini Tunzi

Winners and nominees 
The nominations were announced on March 2, 2021.

Multiple nominations and awards

Special awards 
Icon Award: Alejandro Fernández
Legend Award: José Luis Rodríguez 'El Puma'
Extraordinary Evolution Award: Ozuna

References

External links

 Official account on Facebook
 Official account on Instagram
 Official account on Twitter

2021 music awards
2021 in Latin music
2021 in Florida